SS Montrose was a British merchant steamship that was built in 1897 and wrecked in 1914. She was built as a cargo liner for Elder, Dempster & Company. In 1903 the Canadian Pacific Railway bought her and had her converted into a passenger liner.

Montrose is notable for being the ship on which Hawley Harvey Crippen and his lover Ethel Le Neve fled Britain after Crippen murdered his wife in 1910. Montrose was wrecked in the early months of the First World War after she broke her moorings.

Building
In 1897 the African Steamship Company, part of Elder, Dempster and Company, had a pair of steamships built. Palmers Shipbuilding and Iron Company in Jarrow built Montcalm, launching her on 17 May 1897 and completing her that August. Sir Raylton Dixon and Company in Middlesbrough built her sister ship Montrose, launching her on 17 June 1897 and completing her that September.

The dimensions of the two ships were almost identical. She was primarily a cargo ship, but she had berths for 12 passengers.

Montrose was a coal-burner. She had a single screw, driven by a three-cylinder triple expansion engine built by T Richardson and Sons of Hartlepool.

The African Steamship Co registered Montrose in London. Her UK official number was 108251 and her code letters were PTWV.

Elder, Dempster & Co ordered a second pair of ships from Palmers, built to the same design. Monteagle was launched on 13 December 1898 and completed in March 1899. Montfort was launched on 13 February 1899 and completed that April.

Elder, Dempster career
In September 1897 Montrose began her maiden voyage from Middlesbrough to Quebec and Montreal. On 29 October she began a regular service between Avonmouth and Montreal. In 1900 her ownership was transferred to the African Steamship Co's parent company, Elder Dempster. On 14 March that year Montrose began the first of eight voyages from Liverpool to Cape Town as a troop ship for the Second Boer War.

That year Elder, Dempster formed a new subsidiary, the Imperial Direct West India Mail Service Company, to run services to the Caribbean. By 1902 Elder, Dempster had transferred Montrose to this new subsidiary.

Canadian Pacific career
In 1903 the Canadian Pacific Railway bought Elder, Dempster's shipping service to and from Canada, with 14 ships including Montrose and her three sisters. Canadian Pacific had Montrose refitted with berths for 70 Second Class and 1,800 Third Class passengers.

Canadian Pacific changed Montroses route a number of times. On 20 April 1903 she left Liverpool for Quebec and Montreal. On 7 April 1904 she left London for Antwerp, Southampton and Saint John, New Brunswick. On 28 May 1904 she left London for Antwerp, Quebec and Montreal.

By 1910 Montrose was equipped for wireless telegraphy, which the Marconi Company supplied and operated under contract. By 1911 she was equipped for submarine signalling. By 1913 her wireless call sign was MLJ.

Arrest of Crippen and Le Neve

In 1910 the US homeopath Hawley Harvey Crippen and his lover, Ethel Le Neve, fled England shortly after the suspicious disappearance of his wife. After a body was found in the basement of their London home, Scotland Yard Chief Inspector Walter Dew sought Crippen and Le Neve on suspicion of murder.

Travelling in disguise and under false names, the couple had left Antwerp aboard Montrose on 20 July. Montroses wireless telegraph equipment had a normal range of only . A wireless signal about Crippen and Le Neve reached Montrose while she was still just within range to reply. Her master, Captain H G Kendall, identified the disguised Crippen and Le Neve, and got his wireless operator to reply to this effect. Dew sailed west on the White Star liner , which was quicker and overtook Montrose. When Montrose reached Quebec, Dew arrested the couple and brought them back to England to stand trial.

First World War
In August 1914 Montrose and another Canadian Pacific ship, Montreal, were in Antwerp as the German army was advancing into Belgium. Montreals engine was under repair, and Montrose had been waiting to bunker. Captain  Kendall, who was now working at Antwerp as Canadian Pacific's marine superintendent, got Montreal to bunker Montrose, filled both ships with Belgian refugees, and got Montrose to tow Montreal to England.

Loss
On 28 October 1914 the Admiralty requisitioned Montrose to use as a reserve blockship at Dover. On either 20 or 28 December she broke her moorings in a gale, and drifted onto the Goodwin Sands, where she was wrecked.

References

Bibliography

1897 ships
Maritime incidents in December 1914
Ocean liners
Passenger ships of the United Kingdom
Ships built on the River Tees
Ships of CP Ships
Steamships of the United Kingdom
World War I shipwrecks in the North Sea